Hiša Marije Pomočnice (The Ward of Mary Help of Christians) is a novel by the Slovenian author Ivan Cankar. It was first published in 1904. It was translated into English in 1968 (published in 1976) by Henry Leeming as The Ward of Our Lady of Mercy.

References

See also
List of Slovenian novels

Slovenian novels
Ivan Cankar
1904 novels